Enscherange is a village in the commune of Kiischpelt, in northern Luxembourg.  , the village has a population of 166.

Kiischpelt
Villages in Luxembourg